Princes Freeway  is a  Australian freeway, divided into two sections, both located in Victoria, Australia. The freeway links Melbourne to Geelong in the west, and to Morwell in the east. It continues beyond these extremities as the Princes Highway towards Adelaide to the west and Sydney to the northeast. The freeway bears the designation M1.

The western section linking Geelong and Melbourne is an important commuter and freight route between the two cities; the eastern section links Melbourne with the Latrobe Valley. The entire freeway is one of the busiest sections of rural highway in Victoria, used by large numbers of freight and commercial vehicles and provides access to tourist attractions in central and east Gippsland. It supports Victoria's rural industries and tourism.

Route
The western section (also known as Princes Freeway West or Geelong Road) starts at Corio, in the northern suburbs of Geelong and heads north-east as a six-lane dual-carriageway freeway, widening to eight lanes east of Werribee, and ends at the West Gate Interchange in Laverton, where the Western Ring Road and the old Geelong Road can be accessed by off-ramps. This section ranges from six lanes (three in each direction) between Geelong and Werribee, to ten lanes near the Ring Road interchange. Between 1999 and 2003 the section from Hoppers Crossing to Geelong was progressively widened to provide a third lane in each direction, in addition to a number of other safety upgrades being completed.

The eastern section (also known as Princes Freeway East) starts from Narre Warren, as a six-lane dual-carriageway freeway, narrowing to four lanes just west of Pakenham. There are also several highway-standard at-grade intersections, most notably between Nar Nar Goon and Longwarry. However, traffic still travel through the towns of Yarragon and Trafalgar, therefore urban speed limits apply to these towns (between ) where the road reverts to the Princes Highway (though planning for bypasses of these towns are underway).

The western and eastern sections are connected together through the Melbourne suburbs by West Gate Freeway, CityLink tollway and Monash Freeway. These five sections of road together constitute the route M1 through Melbourne, which is part of National Highway 1.

On the urban section of Princes Freeway (between Laverton North and Werribee), the standard travel time is 9 minutes: 6 minutes between the Western Ring Road and Forsyth Road, and 3 minutes between Forsyth Road and Duncans Road. The usual peak period travel time is between 12 and 18 minutes; however, in times of extreme congestion or traffic accidents, the travel time can well exceed 20 minutes.

History
The Maltby Bypass was Victoria's first freeway which opened on 16 June 1961, and was the first section of Princes Freeway to open.

Both sections of Princes Freeway were signed National Route 1, either inheriting it when converted from older sections of Princes Highway, or assigned when newly constructed to bypass a section of it. With Victoria's conversion to the newer alphanumeric system in the late 1990s, the freeway's National Route 1 designation began conversion to M1 in late 1996, and was completed in 1997. Former bypassed sections of Princes Highway are generally signed as Metropolitan Route 83 or route C109 (western section), Alternative National Route 1 or designated successive routes from C101 to C104 (eastern section).

The passing of the Road Management Act 2004 granted the responsibility of overall management and development of Victoria's major arterial roads to VicRoads: in 2012, VicRoads re-declared the western section as Princes Freeway West (Freeway #1500) from Corio-Waurn Ponds Road in Highton to Little Boundary Road at Laverton North (this definition includes Geelong Ring Road, and in 2007, VicRoads re-declared the eastern section as Princes Freeway East (Freeway #1510) from Monash Freeway at Narre Warren to the eastern end of Princes Drive in Morwell (minus the highway section between Yarragon and Trafalgar). VicRoads also classifies a 5km stretch of road between Newmerella and Orbost as part of Princes Freeway East, despite being a two-lane, single-carriageway road and signed as Princes Highway.

In March 2010 it was announced by the State Government that trucks would be banned from the right-hand lane along a  section of freeway between Geelong and Melbourne. Suggestions of a ban began in 2005 but increased after the fatal 2007 Burnley Tunnel fire that killed three people. A fine of $358 applies to those breaking the rules, the ban being a trial before a full roll-out on the other major roads in the state.

Exits and interchanges

Western section

Eastern section

Current and recent upgrades

Traralgon Bypass & Duplication to Sale
Vicroads has completed a final strategy and plans for the M1 Traralgon Bypass. 4 options were put to the public, with Option 2 chosen as the preferred route.
No further work on the project since 2012 has been made. 
East of Traralgon, the A1 section between Traralgon and Sale is currently being duplicated and upgraded to M road standard.

Geelong Ring Road

The Federal and State Government announced the construction of a new bypass extending 23 kilometres along Geelong's western outskirts from the Princes Freeway in Corio to the Princes Highway in Waurn Ponds. Drivers using the Bypass between Corio and Waurn Ponds will avoid up to 29 sets of traffic lights, with a travel time at freeway speeds of less than 15 minutes compared with the current 25–60 minute trip through Geelong.

The Federal Government allocated $186 million in funding with the State Government providing the remainder, giving a total of $380 million. Construction works for Section 1, between Corio and Bell Post Hill commenced in February 2006. Contracts for Section 2, between Hamlyn Heights and Fyansford, commenced in September 2006 and construction of Section 3, between Fyansford and Waurn Ponds, commenced in November 2007. All 3 stages were scheduled for completion in June 2009.

Duplication to Winchelsea and Colac
West of Geelong, duplication of the Princes Highway between Waurn Ponds and Winchelsea commenced in 2011 and was to be completed by late 2014, though opened in May 2016 after substantially being delayed. Construction for the Winchelsea - Colac section is now underway (which began in early 2016), with both the Victorian and Australian governments contributing $515 million for this project. Once completed around 2018 and beyond, it will be an M standard road.

Pakenham Bypass
The Pakenham Bypass was the final missing link of a continuous freeway from Melbourne to Gippsland in the East of Victoria (excluding the single sets of traffic lights in the small rural towns of Yarragon and Trafalgar). Federal and State Governments jointly funded construction of the bypass at a cost of $242 million which commenced in April 2005 and was completed on 1 December 2007. The 24 km freeway which runs from Beaconsfield to Nar Nar Goon bypasses the townships of Pakenham and Officer and provides an important link between Gippsland and Melbourne.

The new section of freeway also bypassed a small section of the original Princes Freeway at Beaconsfield, which remains as a connection between Princes Highway and the freeway known as the Princes Link Highway. The interchange between Princes Link Highway and the freeway was reconfigured as part of the O'Shea Road extension project, and was completed in 2022.

Future upgrades

Safety improvements

Proposed safety improvements, Princes Freeway East - Nar Nar Goon to Longwarry North, included in the Victorian Government's Auslink 2 funding statement National Transport Links - Growing Victoria's Economy (aka "the Mothership").

Princes Highway East

Proposed duplication of the Princes Highway - Traralgon to Sale, to be funded by Auslink 2 (2009–2014).

Princes Highway West

Proposed duplication of the Princes Hwy - Waurn Ponds to Colac, as well as possible upgrades to Warrnambool, to be funded by Auslink 2 (2009–2014).

See also

 Freeways in Victoria
 Geelong Ring Road
 West Gate Freeway
 Monash Freeway
 Citylink
 Highway 1 (Victoria)
 Highway 1 (Australia)

References

Highways and freeways in Melbourne
Highways in Victoria (Australia)
Transport in Geelong
Highway 1 (Australia)
Transport in the City of Casey
Transport in the Shire of Cardinia
City of Latrobe
Shire of Baw Baw
Transport in the City of Hobsons Bay
Transport in the City of Wyndham
Transport in Barwon South West (region)